Alison Hudnut Clarkson (born April 26, 1955) is an American theatrical producer and politician. She has been the majority leader of the Vermont Senate since 2021, representing the Windsor district as a member of the Democratic Party. Before entering the state senate, she served in the Vermont House of Representatives from the Windsor 5th district from 2005 to 2017.

Clarkson was born in Buffalo, New York, and educated at The Park School of Buffalo and Harvard University. She worked as a theatrical producer for productions which included The Potsdam Quartet and A. R. Gurney's The Middle Ages and served on the New York Theatre Workshop's board of directors.

She was elected to the state house in the 2004 election after Representative Jack Anderson retired. She continued to serve in the state house until her election to the state senate in the 2016 election following the retirement of Senator John F. Campbell. Clarkson was selected to replace Becca Balint as Majority Leader in the state senate in 2020.

Early life and education

Alison Hudnut Clarkson was born in Buffalo, New York, on April 26, 1955, to William Melbourne Elliott Clarkson, who later served as the Executive Deputy Commissioner of Commerce of the State of New York. She graduated from The Park School of Buffalo, which she later served on its board of trustees, and from Harvard University, attending Radcliffe College, with a Bachelor of Arts degree in 1977. Clarkson married Oliver Ramsdell Goodenough, with whom she had two children, on January 12, 1985, and moved to Vermont in 1992.

Clarkson was a theatrical producer and served on the board of directors for the New York Theatre Workshop and Vermont Arts Council board of trustees; the first production she managed was The Potsdam Quartet in 1982, and she produced A. R. Gurney's The Middle Ages in 1983.

Career

Vermont House of Representatives

Jack Anderson, an independent member of the Vermont House of Representatives, retired during the 2004 election. She won the Democratic nomination and defeated Republican nominee Preston J. Bristow Jr. in the general election. She won reelection in the 2006, 2010, 2012, and 2014 elections without opposition. She defeated Republican nominee Geoffrey Peterson, whose name had appeared on the ballot despite him dropping out and who announced in October that he was not in the race, in the 2008 election.

During her tenure in the state house she served on the Judicial Retention committee. She served as the clerk of the Ways and Means committee, and vice-chair and chair of the Legislative Council.

Vermont Senate

John F. Campbell, the President pro tempore of the Vermont Senate, retired during the 2016 election. Clarkson announced her campaign for a seat in the Vermont Senate on April 25, 2016, at a rally attended by Rebecca White, Gabrielle Lucke, and Ernie Shand. She won the Democratic nomination alongside Alice Nitka and Richard McCormack despite Campbell having endorsed Conor Kennedy in the primary and she placed first out of seven candidates in the general election. She placed first out of all candidates in the 2018 and 2020 elections.

During her tenure in the state senate she served on the Judicial Rules, Joint Rules, and Rules committees. She served as the clerk of the Government Operations committee, and vice-chair of the Economic Development, Housing and General Affairs. The Democratic caucus voted unanimously in 2020, to have Clarkson succeed Becca Balint as the Majority Leader after Senator Brian Campion dropped out of contention.

Political positions

In 2007, the state house voted 82 to 63, with Clarkson voting in favor, against legislation to allow doctors to perform assisted suicide on terminally ill patients. The state house voted 95 to 52, with Clarkson in favor, in favor of legalizing same-sex marriage in 2009, and she later voted in favor of the successful overturning of Governor Jim Douglas' veto of the legislation. The Vermont Conservation Voters gave her a lifetime score of 96%. Clarkson and Senator McCormack sponsored legislation in 2017, which created a day in honor of abolitionist John Brown, following the white supremacist Unite the Right rally in Charlottesville, Virginia.

Electoral history

References

1955 births
21st-century American politicians
21st-century American women politicians
Harvard College alumni
Living people
Democratic Party members of the Vermont House of Representatives
Majority leaders of the Vermont Senate
Women state legislators in Vermont
American theatre managers and producers
Politicians from Buffalo, New York